Charles Graham Baker (July 16, 1883 – May 15, 1950) was an American screenwriter and director. He wrote for more than 170 films between 1915 and 1948. He and his father invented the game of Gin rummy in 1909.

Biography
He was born in Evansville, Indiana on July 16, 1883 to Elwood T. Baker and Leslie S. Barrows. He and his father invented the game of Gin rummy in 1909. By 1918 he was working as a "playwright" for the Vitagraph company in Brooklyn, New York City.

Baker died in Reseda, Los Angeles, California on May 15, 1950.

Partial filmography

 The Flaming Omen (1917)
The Grell Mystery (1917)
Love Watches (1918)
Frauds and Frenzies (1918)
The Fortune Hunter (1920)
 The Vice of Fools (1920)
 The Whisper Market (1920)
The Inner Chamber (1921)
The Single Track (1921)
 No Defense (1921)
What's Your Reputation Worth? (1921)
 The Scarab Ring (1921)
 Peggy Puts It Over (1921)
 It Isn't Being Done This Season (1921) 
 The Matrimonial Web (1921)
Fortune's Mask (1922)
 The Angel of Crooked Street (1922)
 The Girl in His Room (1922)
The Man from Brodney's (1923)
The Midnight Alarm (1923)
 Pioneer Trails (1923)
 Masters of Men (1923)
Playing It Wild (1923)
The Man Next Door (1923)
The Girl in the Limousine (1924)
The Beautiful City (1925)
Just Suppose (1926)
The Third Degree (1926)
The Girl from Chicago (1927)
The Singing Fool (1928)
Fancy Baggage (1929)
Sonny Boy (1930)
Broadway Through a Keyhole (1933)
She Couldn't Take It (1935)
Shanghai (1935)
Mary Burns, Fugitive (1935)
 The Girl Friend (1935)
You Only Live Once (1937)
Ali Baba Goes to Town (1937)
Eternally Yours (1939)
Danger Signal (1945)
Ramrod (1947)

References

External links

1883 births
1950 deaths
American male screenwriters
Writers from Evansville, Indiana
Burials at Hollywood Forever Cemetery
Film directors from Indiana
Screenwriters from Indiana
20th-century American male writers
20th-century American screenwriters